Timothy James Collins (24 December 1889 – 19 September 1971) was an Australian rules footballer who played with Melbourne in the Victorian Football League (VFL).

Football
Hawthorn's captain in the MJFA before joining Melbourne, Collins never played again after seriously injuring his knee in the second quarter of the round 13, 1915 loss to Collingwood.

In May 1919, an unidentified former Melbourne footballer, wrote to the football correspondent of The Argus as follows:
"In 1914 the Melbourne football team, after its junction with the University, was a fine team, and succeeded in reaching the semi-finals.Out of this combination the following players enlisted and served at the front:—C. Lilley (seriously wounded), J. Hassett, H. Tomkins (severely wounded), J. Evans (seriously wounded), W. Hendrie, R. L. Park, J. Doubleday (died), A. Best, C. Burge (killed), C. (viz., A.) Williamson (killed), J. Brake, R. Lowell, E. Parsons (seriously wounded), A. M. Pearce (killed), F. Lugton (killed), A. George, C. Armstrong, P. Rodriguez (killed), J. Cannole (viz., Connole), A. Fraser (seriously wounded), T. Collins.These are all players of note, and in themselves would have formed a very fine side, but there is only one of them playing at the present time, viz., C. Lilley, who, as a matter of fact, takes the field under some disability owing to severe wounds which he received on service." — The Argus, 16 May 1919.

Military service
He subsequently enlisted to serve in World War I.

Death
He died at Camberwell, Victoria on 19 September 1971.

See also
 1916 Pioneer Exhibition Game

Notes

References
 First World War Embarkation Roll: Company Quartermaster Sergeant Timothy James Collins (74), in the collection of the Australian War Memorial.
 First World War Nominal Roll: Lieutenant Timothy James Collins, in the collection of the Australian War Memorial.
 First World War Service Record: Lieutenant Timothy James Collins, National Archives of Australia.
 Studio Portrait, December 1917 (P10795.001), collection of the Australian War Memorial.
 Group Portrait, 17 March 1917 (P10795.003), collection of the Australian War Memorial.
 Studio Portrait, December 1917 (P10795.005), collection of the Australian War Memorial.
 Informal portrait, 1918 (P10795.004), collection of the Australian War Memorial.

External links 
	

Demonwiki profile

1889 births
Australian rules footballers from Melbourne
Melbourne Football Club players
Australian military personnel of World War I
1971 deaths
Military personnel from Melbourne